Afshar conquests in the Persian Gulf and Oman — It was intended to transform the Afshar empire into the hegemonic state of the Gulf by capturing the Persian Gulf and its surrounding territories. All campaigns to capture these regions were initially very successful and many targets were captured. However, Mohammad Taghi Khan, whom Nadir Shah Afshar had appointed as admiral, rebelled, and as a result of the loss of power directed at suppressing this rebellion, some of the earlier territories were lost. However, in the end, Muhammad Taghi Khan was captured, the rebellion was suppressed and the previously lost territories were returned.

The rule of the Afshar empire in these lands continued until the death of Nadir Shah Afshar. After the assassination of Nadir Shah in 1747, the entire Afshar empire was engulfed in internal turmoil and the empire was divided. Thus, the gulf regions were lost to the central government and the local magistrates were able to regain their power.

Marches 
Nadir's desire to seize the Persian Gulf was due to his intention to make his empire the main power in the region again. These marches were started from the 1730s and most of them were successfully completed. However, Daryasalar (admiral) Taghi Khan, appointed viceroy by Nadir Shah, could not organize things properly in the localities, and the population started riots and rebellion after the high taxes demanded by the fiscal officials in Fars province. Although Taghi Khan tried to suppress the rebellion in the early days, he failed to do so, and he himself joined the rebellion and began to lead it.

As soon as Taghi Khan joined the uprising, he began to unite the troops in the province around him. Taghi Khan declared that if Rustam Khan, the commander of the naval forces in the Gulf, did not cooperate with him, it would not be possible to mobilize the entire province to revolt against Nadir Shah. According to the source, Taghi Khan went to Bandar Abbas with a group of 20,000 people and tried to involve Rustam Khan and his forces to his side. But Rustam Khan did not betray Nadir Shah. When this happened, Taghi Khan took the path of assassination. Among the people of Bandar Abbas and the Persian generals who were in the service of Rustam Khan, there was such a propaganda that Nadir Shah fell ill. He killed those whom he saw, whom he did not like, without reason and without question. The soldiers of the army in his service fled and dispersed in fear of their lives. Taghi Khan wanted to convey through such propaganda that the
generals in Rustam Khan's group would not be able to get rid of Nadir Shah's anger, and therefore he demanded that they kill Rustam Khan and go over to Taghi Khan's side with the forces in Bandar Abbas. This propaganda of Taghi Khan was successful and soon Rustam Khan was killed. With this, Bandar Abbas and the military forces there fell under the control of the rebels. Taghi Khan also managed to eliminate Kalbali Khan, who was appointed as the chief of the province. The killing of Kalbali Khan happened at the beginning of December 1743. In total, this rebellion reached its peak in late 1743 and early 1744.

Every information received about the extension of the rebellion and the deeds of Taghi Khan increased Nadir Shah's agitation. Because of the war with the Ottoman state, he could not immediately take decisive measures against the suppression of this uprising.

In order to prevent the growing rebellion, Nadir Shah recalled the commander of the military forces in Oman, Muhammad Husain Khan Qirkhli, and sent him against Tagh Khan. He was instructed to attack Taghi Khan before he was prepared to start the uprising. According to the information of "Alam Ara-ye Naderi", the 7,000-strong group of Muhammad Huseyn Khan Kirkhli met Taghi Khan's group in Shiraz. There were 2-3 fights between them. However, neither side could gain an advantage. When this happened, Taghi Khan made a plan to ambush Muhammad Huseyn Khan's group in Shiraz neighbourhoods. And he succeeded with this plan. Nadir Shah was convinced that a larger force should be sent to Persia to suppress Taghi Khan's rebellion. For this purpose, he organized a group of 30,000 troops under the leadership of Allahverdi Khan Kirkhli and sent them to Isfahan. That group of troops headed towards Shiraz from Isfahan.

Allahverdi Khan and his troops camped in a place called Shah Bagh near Shiraz. Taghi Khan first decided to engage in battle with Allahverdi Khan outside the fortress. His group of 10,000-12,000 people left the fortress and attacked Nadir Shah's forces. The battle between the parties lasted several hours. Although Taghi Khan entered the battle with great hopes, he could not break the resistance of Allahverdi Khan's group. His group suffered heavy losses and was forced to retreat back into the fort.

According to "Alam Ara-ye Naderi", the siege of Shiraz fortress lasted for two months. Nadir Shah was not satisfied with the length of the siege, and he conveyed his concern to Allahverdi Khan. Nadir Shah even sent an additional military force to hasten the conquest of Shiraz. But the defense capabilities of the Shiraz fortress made all the attempts unsuccessful. When the siege of the fortress reached three months, the discontent among the generals of Taghi Khan allowed the capture of Shiraz. One of the generals standing in defense of the castle walls said that he was ready to open the castle gate if his family would be spared. Allahverdi Khan gave a written guarantee to that commander, and with this, it was possible to open the gates of the castle. Having heard about Nadir Shah's forces entering the fortress, Taghi Khan managed to escape from the fortress with his son. But resistance within the fortress continued for a long time.

In the last days of Nadir's life, he experienced some problems, became more and more brutal, and the costs of continuous military campaigns were imposed on the population, which led to the gradual increase of people's dissatisfaction. Gradually, the whole country was covered by rebellions.

References

History of the Persian Gulf
History of Oman
Wars involving Afsharid Iran
Campaigns of Nader Shah